Live at Carnegie Hall: The 50th Anniversary Concert is a live album by Patti Page, released through the record label DRG in 1998.

Reception

The album won the 1999 Grammy Award for Best Traditional Pop Vocal Album.

Track listing
 "Person Who Used to Be Me/A Brand New Me" (Bell, Cohan, Gamble, Grossman) – 6:45
 "With My Eyes Wide Open, I'm Dreaming" (Mack Gordon, Harry Revel) – 2:47
 "It's a Wonderful World" (Adamson, Savitt, Watson) – 1:35
 "Can You Feel the Love Tonight?" (Elton John, Tim Rice) – 3:46
 "Ain't No Sunshine/You Are My Sunshine" (Jimmie Davis, Charles Mitchell, Bill Withers) – 2:44
 Movie Medley: "In the Wee Small Hours" / "The Nearness of You" /  "When I Fall in Love"(Hoagy Carmichael, Heyman, Hilliard, Mann, Ned Washington, Young) – 6:07
 "Old Cape Cod" (Allan Jeffrey, Claire Rothrock, Milton Yakus) – 2:58
 "Release Me" ( Eddie Miller, Dub Williams, Robert Yount) – 3:32
 "Go on Home" (Cochran) – 2:21
 "Less Than a Song" (Axton) – 3:05
 "Unchained Melody" (Alex North, Hy Zaret) – 4:46
 "The More I See You" (Gordon, Harry Warren) – 2:59
 "Allegheny Moon" (Al Hoffman, Dick Manning) – 2:33
 "A Foggy Day" (George Gershwin, Ira Gershwin) – 4:03
 "I Stayed Too Long at the Fair" (Barnes) – 5:49
 "Detour" (Paul Westmoreland) – 3:54
 Hits Medley: "(How Much Is That) Doggie in the Window" / "You Belong to Me"(Benjamin, Coleman, Darion, David, DeVol, Horton, Pee Wee King, Bob Merrill, Chilton Price, Robinson, Russell, Spina, Redd Stewart, Weiss) – 8:04
 "Tennessee Waltz" (King, Stewart) – 2:35

Personnel
 John Harris – engineer
 Chuck Hughes – drums
 Allan Jeffrey – composer
 Eric Kohler – design
 Claire Rothrock – composer
 Alan Silverman – mastering
 Milton Yakus – composer

References

1998 live albums
Albums recorded at Carnegie Hall
Grammy Award for Best Traditional Pop Vocal Album
Patti Page albums